Walter Goines is an American former Negro league pitcher who played in the 1930s.

Goines played for the Montgomery Grey Sox in 1932. In three recorded appearances on the mound, he posted a 3.95 ERA over 13.2 innings.

References

External links
 and Seamheads

Year of birth missing
Place of birth missing
Montgomery Grey Sox players